Frederick Joseph "Fritz" Harlfinger II (September 14, 1913 – December 21, 1993) was a United States Navy officer who served as a submarine commander during World War II and later commanded the South Atlantic Force of the U.S. Atlantic Fleet. He then served as director of the Office of Naval Intelligence and finally as director of Command Support Programs in the Office of the Chief of Naval Operations, with the rank of vice admiral.

Early life and education
Born in Albany, New York,  He attended the Cathedral Academy, which was a Roman Catholic high school in Albany. Harlfinger was appointed to the United States Naval Academy in 1931, graduating in 1935. He later studied at the Industrial College of the Armed Forces from August 1954 to May 1955.

Military career
As his first assignment, Harlfinger served for two years as an officer on the battleship .

Harlfinger was given command of the submarine  in May 1943.

After her commissioning, he served as her skipper from August 1945 to May 1947. In 1950, Harlfinger helped to organize Submarine Division 43 and then served as its first commanding officer from March 1951 to January 1952.

Harlfinger was promoted to captain effective July 1, 1954. In August 1955, he became the first postwar naval attaché in Bonn, West Germany. Harlfinger was subsequently awarded the Commander's Cross of the Order of Merit by the West German government.

Harlfinger served as the commanding officer of the ammunition ship  from June 1957 to July 1958. He was then given command of Submarine Squadron Twelve.

Harlfinger served as the commanding officer of Submarine Flotilla One from October 1962 to December 1963. He was next made assistant director for Collection at the Defense Intelligence Agency, serving from January 1964 to January 1967. Harlfinger was promoted to rear admiral effective April 1, 1964 and was awarded the Legion of Merit for this assignment.

In March 1967, Harlfinger was given command of the South Atlantic Force of the U.S. Atlantic Fleet based in San Juan, Puerto Rico. He then served as director of the Office of Naval Intelligence from August 1968 to July 1971.

Harlfinger next served as director of Command Support Programs in the Office of the Chief of Naval Operations until his retirement in March 1974. His promotion to vice admiral was approved by the Senate on October 7, 1971 and he received a Navy Distinguished Service Medal for this final assignment.

Personal
Harlfinger was the son of Augustus Bernhard Harlfinger and Marie Ann (Berben) Harlfinger.

Harlfinger married Frances Clarke "Fran" Blance (September 25, 1917 – February 22, 1991). She was the daughter of Clarke Blance (September 30, 1886 – October 9, 1954), a U.S. Army Medical Corps physician who served during both World War I and II and retired as a colonel in 1947. The couple had two sons, two daughters and seven grandchildren.

Harlfinger was interred at Arlington National Cemetery on January 6, 1994.

References

External links
 Frederick Joseph Harlfinger, 2nd, USN (uboat.net)

1913 births
1993 deaths
People from Albany, New York
United States Naval Academy alumni
United States Navy personnel of World War II
United States submarine commanders
Recipients of the Silver Star
Recipients of the Navy Cross (United States)
United States naval attachés
Commanders Crosses of the Order of Merit of the Federal Republic of Germany
United States Navy admirals
Recipients of the Legion of Merit
Directors of the Office of Naval Intelligence
Recipients of the Navy Distinguished Service Medal
People from Sarasota, Florida
Burials at Arlington National Cemetery